Catman may refer to:

In animations
 A recurring character in the Adult Swim cartoon Perfect Hair Forever
 A Batman-referenced recurring superhero character in the Nickelodeon cartoon The Fairly OddParents

In comics
 Cat-Man and Kitten, a pair of superhero characters created by Charles M. Quinlan and Irwin Hasen
 Catman (DC Comics), a DC Comics character that has appeared in opposition to Batman and other characters
 Cat-Man (Marvel Comics), the name of four fictional characters in the Marvel Universe

In films and videos
 The hero of several animated music videos for ska group The Planet Smashers
 US Catman, the hero of a series of martial arts films

In literature
 "Catman", a 1974 short story by Harlan Ellison

In mythology and folklore
 Werecat, a feline therianthropic creature
 Hombre Gato (translated "Catman" in English), a half-man, half-cat creature in South American legend

Nicknames
 Catman (musician), David Taieb (born 1971), French musician and producer
 Peter Criss or Eric Singer from the band, Kiss
 René Chartrand, "The Catman of the Hill", who takes care of the Canadian parliamentary cats
 Stalking Cat, a man who surgically altered his body to resemble that of a tiger
 Catmando, a cat who served as joint leader of Britain's Official Monster Raving Loony Party from 1999 to 2002

See also
 Cat People (disambiguation)
 Cat-Man (disambiguation)
 Katman
 Xatman